Lebyazhye is a rural locality (a selo) in Severny Selsoviet, Pervomaysky District, Altai Krai, Russia. The population was 236 as of 2013. There are 2 streets.

Geography 
Lebyazhye is located 80 km north of Novoaltaysk (the district's administrative centre) by road. Zhuravlikha and Severny are the nearest rural localities.

References 

Rural localities in Pervomaysky District, Altai Krai